Morgan Conway  (born Sidney Conway, March 16, 1903 – November 16, 1981 ) was an American actor, best known for his portrayals of Dick Tracy.

Early life and career
Conway was born in Newark, New Jersey, in 1903. He was educated at Columbia University in New York City. He had a brokerage business in New York City for 11 years before closing it in 1933. He went to Hollywood and began acting in little theatre. 

Returning to New York, Conway acted on Broadway in plays that included Angel Island (1937), In the Bag (1937), Mimie Scheller (1936), Summer Wives (1936), and If a Body (1935).

For many years he freelanced, working for various studios in bits or supporting roles. His most familiar appearance from this period is probably in Charlie Chan in Reno (1939).

RKO Radio Pictures and portrayal of Dick Tracy
By the mid-1940s he was a contract player for RKO Radio Pictures, and he was chosen to portray Chester Gould's comic-strip detective Dick Tracy in a pair of feature films: Dick Tracy and Dick Tracy vs. Cueball. RKO's earliest publicity photos posed Conway in profile, hoping to emulate Gould's square-jawed caricatures. Morgan Conway is considered by many (including Dick Tracy writer Max Allan Collins) to be the best screen Dick Tracy. 

Actor Ralph Byrd had played the role in four hit serials, and some exhibitors petitioned RKO to make more Tracy features, but with Byrd. RKO made the substitution, reassigning Conway to two other "B" features. The studio abandoned most of its "B" product in 1947 and Conway's contract was not renewed. In 1948, author Chester Gould proposed that RKO should continue the series, stipulating that Morgan Conway should play the lead, but RKO (then in organizational turmoil after the studio's sale to Howard Hughes) declined.

The Tracy role eventually led to Conway's quitting acting in 1947, because he felt that he had become stereotyped as that character. "I had to do it," he said. "People began to stop thinking of me as Morgan Conway. All they could seem to remember was that I was Dick Tracy in the movies."

In 1948, Conway began an independent production company, planning to make one film per year.

Later life
 
Conway left the motion picture industry and returned to New Jersey, where he died of lung cancer at the age of 78, having dabbled in real estate on and off for some years. He was survived by his second wife, Lilian—the couple had been happily married for several decades. Back in the late 1920s, Syd had been briefly married to a young divorcee of some means from Alabama, Aurelia Fitzpatrick Carr, who bore and raised his only child, a son, Ben Conway. Syd and son (and later Ben's wife and children) shared quality time in the late 1940s and early 1950s after Ben returned to New York from his military service in post-war Japan. From the early 1960s to early 1990s, Ben was a prominent literary agent in Hollywood, helping launch a number of writing and directing careers in the same industry in which his father had worked.

Partial filmography

 Looking for Trouble (1934) as Dan Sutter
 Happy Landing (1934) as Frank Harland
 The Nurse from Brooklyn (1938) as Inspector Donohue
 Sinners in Paradise (1938) as Harrison Brand
 Crime Ring (1938) as Ray Taylor
 Illegal Traffic (1938) as State's Attorney Ryan
 Smashing the Spy Ring (1938) as Professor Leonard (uncredited)
 Off the Record (1939) as Lou Baronette
 North of Shanghai (1939) as Bob Laird
 Blackwell's Island (1939) as Steve Cardigan
 Wings of the Navy (1939) as Tommy - Duty Officer (uncredited)
 Secret Service of the Air (1939) as Edward P. Powell
 The Kid from Kokomo (1939) as Louie
 Charlie Chan in Reno (1939) as George Bentley
 Grand Jury Secrets (1939) as Thomas Reedy
 The Spellbinder (1939) as Mr. Carrington
 Television Spy (1939) as Carl Venner
 Sued for Libel (1939) as Albert Pomeroy
 Private Detective (1939) as Nat Flavin
 3 Cheers for the Irish (1940) as Joe Niklas
 The Saint Takes Over (1940) as Sam Reese
 Florian (1940) as Kingston (uncredited)
 Brother Orchid (1940) as Philadelphia Powell
 A Fugitive from Justice (1940) as 'Julie' Alexander
 Millionaires in Prison (1940) as James Brent
 Sing Your Worries Away (1942) as Chesty Martin (uncredited)
 A Desperate Chance for Ellery Queen (1942) as Ray Stafford
 Bells of Capistrano (1942) as Stag Johnson
 Tornado (1943) as Gary Linden
 Jack London (1943) as Richard Harding Davos
 Canyon City (1943) as Craig Morgan
 Dick Tracy (1945) as Dick Tracy
 The Truth About Murder (1946) as Dist. Atty. Lester Ashton
 Badman's Territory as (1946) Marshall Bill Hampton
 Dick Tracy vs. Cueball (1946) as Dick Tracy
 Vacation in Reno (1946) as Joe (final film role)

References

External links

1903 births
1981 deaths
Male actors from Newark, New Jersey
Columbia University alumni
RKO Pictures contract players
American male film actors
20th-century American male actors